Bianca Andreescu and Carol Zhao were the defending champions, but Zhao chose not to participate. Andreescu played alongside Carson Branstine, but lost in the quarterfinals to Elitsa Kostova and Katherine Sebov.

Tara Moore and Conny Perrin won the title after defeating Sharon Fichman and Maria Sanchez 6–0, 5–7, [10–7] in the final.

Seeds

Draw

Draw

References
Main Draw

Challenger Banque Nationale de Saguenay - Doubles
Challenger de Saguenay